Peebo or Peebos may refer to:

 Annely Peebo (born 1971), Estonian mezzo-soprano
 Margit Peebo, Estonian curler - see Estonian Women's Curling Championship
 Peebo, a robot character in Choudenshi Bioman, a Japanese television series
 Peebos, self-aware bombs in the Gold Digger comic book series

See also  
 Peabo Bryson (born 1951), American singer and songwriter
 Peabo, his debut album

Estonian-language surnames